Borys Mykolayovych Krushynskyi (born 10 May 2002) is a Ukrainian professional footballer who plays as a centre-back Polissya Zhytomyr.

Career

Lviv
Born in Sambir Raion, Krushynskyi is a product of the neighbouring Mostyska and Lviv academies. He played for Lviv in the Ukrainian Premier League Reserves and in August 2020 Krushynskyi was promoted to the senior squad. He made his debut in the Ukrainian Premier League for Lviv as a second half-time substituted player on 28 April 2021, playing in a drawing derby home match against Rukh Lviv.

Polissya Zhytomyr
On 6 January 2023 he moved to Polissya Zhytomyr.

References

External links 
 
 

2002 births
Living people
Sportspeople from Lviv Oblast
Ukrainian footballers
Association football defenders
FC Lviv players
Ukrainian Premier League players